Farakhi, Farrakhi, Farokhi, Farrokhi, Farrukhi, Farukhi or Farkhi may refer to:
 Farrokhi, Isfahan, a city in Iran
 Farakhi, South Khorasan, a village in Iran
Hoseyn Farakhi, a village in Iran
Farrukhi (name)